Don Sharpe (4 July 1929 –  13 November 2004) was a sound editor. He won for the film Aliens for Best Sound Editing at the 1986 Academy Awards.
He had over 90 editing credits over his 50-year career.
He also won the BAFTA award for sound for the film The French Lieutenant's Woman.

Selected filmography

Inventing the Abbotts (1997)
Year of the Comet (1992)
Batman (1989)
Gorillas in the Mist (1988)
Aliens (1986)
Santa Claus: The Movie (1985)
Superman III (1983)
An American Werewolf in London (1981)
The French Lieutenant's Woman (1981)
Superman II (1980)
Jesus of Nazareth (1977)
Robin and Marian (1976)
The Land that Time Forgot (1975)
The Three Musketeers (1973)
Sleuth (1972)
Anne of the Thousand Days (1969)

References

External links

1929 births
2004 deaths
Best Sound BAFTA Award winners
Best Sound Editing Academy Award winners
British sound editors